Kapkaykent (Qapkaygent) is a rural locality (a selo) in Kayakentsky District, Republic of Dagestan, Russia. The population was 1,020 as of 2010. There are 21 streets.

Geography 
Kapkaykent is located 31 km southwest of Novokayakent (the district's administrative centre) by road. Dzhavankent and Bashlykent are the nearest rural localities.

Nationalities 
Kumyks live there.

References 

Rural localities in Kayakentsky District